Heart septal defect refers to a congenital heart defect of one of the septa of the heart.
 Atrial septal defect
 Atrioventricular septal defect
 Ventricular septal defect

Although aortopulmonary septal defects are defects of the aorticopulmonary septum, which is not technically part of the heart, they are sometimes grouped with the heart septal defects.

References

External links 

Congenital heart defects